Ricochet Romance is a 1954 American western comedy film directed by Charles Lamont and starring Marjorie Main, Chill Wills and Alfonso Bedoya. It was produced and distributed by Universal Pictures. Its title is derived from the song of the same name, which is also featured in the film. It is also known as The Matchmakers.

Plot

Cast
 Marjorie Main as Pansy Jones
 Chill Wills as Tom Williams
 Pedro Gonzalez Gonzalez as Manuel González
 Alfonso Bedoya as Alfredo González
 Rudy Vallee as Worthington Higgenmacher
 Ruth Hampton as Angela Ann Mansfield
 Benay Venuta as Claire Renard
 Rachel Ames as Betsy Williams
 Darryl Hickman as Dave King
 Lee Aaker as Timmy Williams
 Irene Ryan as Miss Clay
 Philip Tonge as Mr. Webster
 Phil Chambers as Mr. Daniels
 Charles Watts as Mr. Harvey
 Marjorie Bennett as Mrs. Harvey

Release and reception
The film premiered in Los Angeles on October 27, 1954.

TV Guide awarded the film 3 out of 5 stars, saying: "The plot is ultra-thin, merely a frame to hang some mild slapstick routines on. This film is little different from Main's other amiable comedies."

References

External links
 

1954 films
1950s Western (genre) comedy films
American Western (genre) comedy films
Films based on songs
Universal Pictures films
American black-and-white films
Films directed by Charles Lamont
1950s English-language films
1950s American films